The  were officials of the Republic of Venice responsible for the provisioning and equipment of the ships and crews of the Venetian navy.

History

In 1545, two  were established, raised in 1644 to three, to supervise the provisioning, equipment and clothing of the fleet and its crews. They had the right to appoint any officer other than patricians, and to try disputes between officers, sailors, and convict crewmen.

The  had to be kept abreast of the location and role of all naval personnel at all times, so that anyone required for a particular task might be mobilized at once. This lasted until the end of the 16th century. With the onset of a longer period of peace after that, the rolls of eligible personnel, supposed to be renewed every ten years, were neglected.

The  were also responsible for supervising the outfitting and decommissioning of every warship in person, checking the presence of the assigned crews and material and the accounting books, and of handing over to the captains their written instructions. Galley captains were obliged to report the number of their hired crewmen and the money owed to the  upon the decommissioning of their ship within 15 days.

References

Sources
 
 

Government of the Republic of Venice
1545 establishments in Italy
16th-century establishments in the Republic of Venice
Venetian navy